General elections were held in Tanzania on 30 October 1970. The country was a one-party state at the time, with the Tanganyika African National Union as the sole legal party on the mainland, and the Afro-Shirazi Party was the only party in Zanzibar. For the National Assembly election there were two candidates from the same party in each of the 106 constituencies, whilst the presidential election was effectively a referendum on TANU leader Julius Nyerere's candidacy.

Voter turnout was 70.1% in the presidential election and 66.6% in the National Assembly election.

Nyerere took the presidential oath on 5 November 1970. At the same time he announced members of the new government led by Prime Minister Amani Karume, deputy Prime Minister and Defense Minister Rashid Mfaume Kawama, second deputy and Foreign Affairs Minister Isael Melinawingha, finances Amir Habib Jamal, trade and industry Paul Bomani, communication, transport and employment Job Malecela Luisinde, education Chadiel Johann Mgonji, economy and development Abdul Rahman Mohamed Babu, accommodation and rural and urban development John Mhavile, information and radio Jacob Namfu, water and energy PhD Wilbert Chaguli. Ali Hassan Mweny was appointed as the State Minister at the President's Office.

Results

President

National Assembly

References

Presidential elections in Tanzania
Tanzania
1970 in Tanzania
Elections in Tanzania
One-party elections
Election and referendum articles with incomplete results